John Allan McInnes (3 September 1884 – 4 June 1950) was an Australian rules footballer who played with Geelong in the Victorian Football League (VFL).

Notes

External links 

1884 births
1950 deaths
Australian rules footballers from Victoria (Australia)
Geelong Football Club players